Battle of the Hook refers to several engagements during the Korean War. They were:

 First Battle of the Hook, in October 1952

 Second Battle of the Hook, in November 1952

 Third Battle of the Hook, in May 1953

 Fourth Battle of the Hook, part of the Battle of the Samichon River, in July 1953